Fixit may refer to:

 Finland's departure from the European Union and/or the Eurozone
 Fixit (Teen Titans), a character in the Teen Titans animated series
 Fixit (Transformers), a member of the Micromasters
 Joe Fixit, an alias of the Hulk in Marvel Comics
 Fixit, a robot character and assistant to Relic the Pika in the Sonic the Hedgehog comics